The 1989 King Cup was the 31st season of knockout competition since its establishment in 1956. Al-Ittihad were the defending champions for this season, but they were eliminated by Al-Nassr in Round of 16.

Al Hilal won  their sixth title after beating Al Nassr 3–0 in the final. As winners of the tournament, Al-Hilal qualified for the 1990–91 Asian Cup Winners' Cup.

Bracket

Note:     H: Home team,   A: Away team

Round of 16
The matches of the Round of 16 were held on 11 and 12 May 1989.

Quarter-finals
The Quarter-final matches were held on 15 May 1989.

Semi-finals
The Semi-final matches were held on 18 May 1989.

Final
The final was played between Al-Hilal and Al-Nassr in the Youth Welfare Stadium in Jeddah. Al-Hilal were appearing in their 12th final while Al-Nassr were appearing in their 9th final.

Top goalscorers

References

1989
Saudi Arabia
Cup